McCullum is the surname of several people:
Brendon McCullum (born 1981), New Zealand cricketer, brother of Nathan, son of Stuart
Julito McCullum (born 1990), American film and television actor and rapper
Mac McCullum, a character in the Left Behind Christian novel series
Nathan McCullum (born 1980), New Zealand cricketer, brother of Brendon, son of Stuart
Robert McCullum (born 1954), American collegiate basketball coach
Sam McCullum (born 1952), American football wide receiver
Stuart McCullum (born 1956), New Zealand cricketer
Donna Culver Krebbs, a character in the American television series Dallas, née Donna McCullum
Melinda O'Hearn, American actress, professional wrestler, and model, née Melina McCullum

See also
McCallum (disambiguation)